The It's Not Me, It's You World Tour is the second concert tour by English singer-songwriter Lily Allen in support her second studio album, It's Not Me, It's You. The tour visited Europe, North America, Asia, Oceania and South America.

Opening acts
 Example (United Kingdom & Ireland – November/December) 
 La Roux (United Kingdom – March) 
 Natalie Portman's Shaved Head (North America)
 Cassette Kids (Australia)
 Just Jack (11 July and 22 October only)
 Dizzee Rascal – Australia (Brisbane only)
 Calvin Harris – Australia (Brisbane only)
 The Big Pink – London (10 September only)
 White Rabbits – London (10 September only)
 Professor Green – Australia (2010 Dates only)

Setlist 
{{hidden
| headercss = background: #ccccff; font-size: 100%; width: 65%;
| contentcss = text-align: left; font-size: 100%; width: 75%;
| header = Main
| content =
"Everyone's at It"
"I Could Say"
"Never Gonna Happen"
"Oh My God" / "Everything's Just Wonderful"
"Him"
"Who'd Have Known"
"LDN"/"Dance wiv Me"
"Back to the Start"
"He Wasn't There"
"Littlest Things"
"Chinese"
"22"
"Not Fair"
"Fuck You"

Encore
"Smile"
"The Fear"
"Womanizer" (Britney Spears cover)
}}

Notes 
 "Dance wiv Me" was not performed in the United States.
 In Ireland "Not Fair" was not performed in its normal position, it was the last song.
 While performing "Womanizer" at the Los Angeles show, Lindsay Lohan joined Allen onstage for a brief moment.
Calvin Harris and Dizzee Rascal both performed at the Brisbane show on 19 January 2010.
 "Why" was performed in São Paulo, right after "I Could Say" in the setlist.
 "Knock 'Em Out" was performed in London on late 2009.
 In concert at São Paulo, "Fuck You" and "Not Fair" were moved to the Encore and "Smile", "The Fear" and "Womanizer" left the encore.

Tour dates

Box office score data

References 

Lily Allen concert tours
2009 concert tours
2010 concert tours
Concert tours of Asia
Concert tours of Australia
Concert tours of Canada
Concert tours of Europe
Concert tours of France
Concert tours of Germany
Concert tours of Ireland
Concert tours of Japan
Concert tours of North America
Concert tours of New Zealand
Concert tours of South America
Concert tours of the United Kingdom
Concert tours of the United States